The Ministry of Internal Affairs, Wayamba Development and Cultural Affairs is the central government ministry of Sri Lanka responsible for internal affairs, development of Wayamba and culture. The ministry is responsible for formulating and implementing national policy on internal affairs, Waymba development and cultural affairs and other subjects which come under its purview. The current Minister of Internal Affairs, Wayamba Development and Cultural Affairs and Deputy Minister of Internal Affairs, Wayamba Development and Cultural Affairs are S. B. Nawinne and Palitha Thewarapperuma respectively. The ministry's secretary is D. Swarnapala.

Ministers
The Minister of Internal Affairs, Wayamba Development and Cultural Affairs is a member of the Cabinet of Sri Lanka.

Secretaries

References

External links
 

Internal Affairs, Wayamba Development and Cultural Affairs
 
Sri Lanka
 
Sri Lanka
Internal Affairs, Wayamba Development and Cultural Affairs